The  Historia Croylandensis is a series of bound documents, allegedly from the 15th century, containing a fake history of the Benedictine abbey of Croyland in Lincolnshire, England.

The Historia Croylandensis contains a history of the Croyland Abbey dating back to the 9th century.  It also contains basic letters which should prove the basic rights of the monastery.

The work is in reality a fake work created to win a lawsuit in 1413 for property rights.  Together with the basic letters, the Croyland Abbey won the legal dispute with these documents. 
Historically, Historia Croylandensis has long been considered a source of mediaeval lifestyle in England.  Only in the 19th century was the work recognized as a forgery.  It was noticeable that some monks were reported to be 140 years old.  Furthermore, several had studied in Oxford, although the university was not founded in truth.

manuscripts
The original of the Historia Croylandensis is not known.  There are several traditions.  The fragmentary "British Library (BL) Cotton MS Ortho B xiij" (15th century) and "BL Arundel 178" (16th century).

References

Document forgeries